The 1996 Australian Men's Hardcourt Championships was a men's tennis tournament played on outdoor hard courts at the Memorial Drive Park in Adelaide, Australia and was part of the World Series of the 1996 ATP Tour. The tournament ran from 1 January through 7 January 1996. First-seeded Yevgeny Kafelnikov won the singles title.

Finals

Singles

 Yevgeny Kafelnikov defeated  Byron Black 7–6(7–0), 3–6, 6–1
 It was Kafelnikov's 1st title of the year and the 16th of his career.

Doubles

 Todd Woodbridge /  Mark Woodforde defeated  Jonas Björkman /  Tommy Ho 7–5, 7–6
 It was Woodbridge's 1st title of the year and the 36th of his career. It was Woodforde's 1st title of the year and the 44th of his career.

External links
 ATP Tournament Profile

Australian Men's Hardcourt Championships
Next Generation Adelaide International
Hard
1990s in Adelaide
January 1996 sports events in Australia